Bárbaro Félix Marín (born 4 March 1961, in Havana) is a Cuban actor.

He studied at the  Escuela Nacional de Instructores de Arte de Cuba.

Filmography
 Lecciones para un Beso, 2011
 El Cuerno de la Abundancia, 2008
 Música Cubana, 2003
 Aunque estés lejos, 2003
 Las Profecías de Amanda, 1998
 Doña Bárbara, 1997
 Záfiros Locura Azul, 1997
 Calor... y celos, 1996
 Tierra Índigo, 1995
 Caravana, 1989
 Asalto al Amanecer, 1987

Television 
Niche  2014
 El Cartel de los Sapos 2, 2011
 Al Compás del Son, 2008
 Las Huérfanas de la Obrapía, 2000
 Andoba, 2000
 Día y Noche, 1993–1996
 Pasión y Prejuicio, 1992
 La Casa de las Flores, 1990
 Tren de Noviembre, 1986

References and external links
 
 www.gabrielblanco.cc

Living people
Cuban male film actors
People from Havana
Cuban male television actors
20th-century Cuban male actors
21st-century Cuban male actors
1959 births